Vangie Tang Wing-chi  (born 22 May 1985) is a Hong Kong singer. She is a top 8 finalist of the 22nd annual New Talent Singing Awards in 2003. She is signed to Sony Music of Hong Kong since 2004.

She entered the 2003 International Chinese New Talent Singing Championship – Hong Kong Regional Finals and became a top 8 finalist.  Afterwards, her talents were discovered by C C To (杜自持), and under his tutelage, she was signed to Sony Music.

Her debut album Glass Shoes was released on 3 December 2004. Her second album V2 was released on 8 December 2005. Her third album Summer Never Ends was released in October 2007.

References

External links 
Vangie's Yahoo Blog (in Chinese)
2003 New Talent Singing Awards Contestant Profile (in Chinese)
VangieTang BBS (in Chinese)
百度貼吧_鄧穎芝吧 (in Chinese)
VanGiE House (in Chinese)
 (in Chinese)
 (in Chinese)

21st-century Hong Kong women singers
Cantopop singers
1985 births
Living people